Ab Murd or Ab Moord or Ab Mowrd or Abmurd may refer to:

Ab Murd-e Dam Ludab
Ab Murd-e Tangiar